The 1893 Army Cadets football team represented the United States Military Academy in the 1893 college football season. In their first and only season under head coach Laurie Bliss, the Cadets compiled a 4–5 record and were outscored by their opponents by a combined total of 109 to 84.  In the annual Army–Navy Game, the Cadets lost to the Midshipmen by a 6 to 4 score.

No Army Cadets were honored on the 1893 College Football All-America Team.

Schedule

Players
The following Cadets were members of the 1893 Army football team.
 Thales Lucius Ames, Wisconsin - center
 Dwight Edward Aultman, Pennsylvania - right tackle (USS General D. E. Aultman (AP-156) named in his honor)
 John Somerville Battle, North Carolina - left tackle
 A. P. Berry
 W. J. Borden
 Jens Bugge, Jr., Minnesota
 Reynolds Johnson Burt, Ohio
 Thomas Gillespie Carson, Illinois - fullback
 William Durward Connor, Iowa
 Samuel George Creden, Massachusetts - backup quarterback
 Samuel Field Dallam, Pennsylvania
 Chase Doster, Kansas
 Ralph Willard Drury, Massachusetts
 Daniel Duncan, Kentucky - backup left halfback
 James Paxton Harbeson, Kentucky - right end
 James Villard Heidt, Georgia
 James William Hinkley, Jr., New York - quarterback
 Franklin Swart Hutton, New York
 Edward Leonard King, Massachusetts
 Abraham Grant Lott, Kansas - left guard
 Willard Herman McCornack, Illinois
 Dennis E. Nolan, New York - left end
 Paul Reisinger, Pennsylvania
 Otho Bane Rosenbaum, Virginia
 George Henry Shelton, Connecticut - left halfback
 Fine Wilson Smith, Kentucky - right guard
 Lucian Stacey, Maine - right halfback
 David Sheridan Stanley
 Harry Howard Stout, Pennsylvania
 W. A. White
 Clarence Charles Williams, Georgia

References

Army
Army Black Knights football seasons
Army Cadets football